The dudumanku is a one-string fiddle of the Oroch people of the Russian Far East.

See also
T'yngryng, a Nivkh one-string fiddle

References

Russian musical instruments
One-string fiddles
Culture of Khabarovsk Krai